Matevž Kordež (born 13 September 1919, date of death unknown) was a Slovenian cross-country skier. He competed at the 1948 Winter Olympics and the 1956 Winter Olympics.

References

1919 births
Year of death missing
Slovenian male cross-country skiers
Olympic cross-country skiers of Yugoslavia
Cross-country skiers at the 1948 Winter Olympics
Cross-country skiers at the 1956 Winter Olympics
People from the Municipality of Radovljica